Viktor Senger (1870–1942) was a German stage and film actor.

Selected filmography
 Frank Hansen's Fortune (1917)
 Cain (1918)
 Europe, General Delivery (1918)
 Madame Récamier (1920)
 Johann Baptiste Lingg (1920)
 Dancer of Death (1920)
 Mignon (1922)
 Rudderless (1924)
 Women You Rarely Greet (1925)
 Bismarck (1925)
 Bismarck 1862–1898 (1927)
 The Marriage Nest (1927)
 The Old Fritz (1928)
 The Fate of Renate Langen (1931)
 The Last Waltz (1934)

References

Bibliography

External links

1870 births
1942 deaths
German male film actors
German male silent film actors
20th-century German male actors
German male stage actors
Actors from Darmstadt